Adré Smith (born 4 June 1997) is a South African rugby union player for the  in the Currie Cup and the  in the Rugby Challenge. His regular position is flank.

References

South African rugby union players
Living people
1997 births
People from Swellendam
Rugby union flankers
Blue Bulls players
Griquas (rugby union) players
Stormers players
Western Province (rugby union) players
Rugby union players from the Western Cape